God is Red: A Native View of Religion, by Vine Deloria, Jr. (Standing Rock Sioux), is a nonfiction book that discusses traditional Native American religious views, particularly their relation to Western Christianity. It also details the hardships faced by Native Americans as their country was quickly flooded with foreigners eager for land and other resources. Deloria links the anthropocentrism of Christian orthodoxy and subsequent American economic philosophies with increasing environmental upheaval. Deloria also explains how religious views are rooted to "place" as opposed to being universal.

The book was first published in 1973, then 1992, and 2003.

See also
 The red road

Notes

External links
 
God Is Red: A Native View of Religion, on Google Books

Non-fiction books about Native Americans
Native American creationism
Native American religion
Religious studies books
Works by Vine Deloria Jr.